Eduard Rroca (born 28 July 1993) is an Albanian professional footballer who plays for Süper Lig club İstanbulspor.

Club career

Luftëtari 
In September 2015, Rroca moved to then Kategoria e Parë club Luftëtari. He made his league debut for the club on 12 September 2015 in a 2–0 away victory over Dinamo Tirana. He played all ninety minutes of that match. He scored his first league goal for the club a little over a month later, in a 3–1 away victory over Butrinti on 24 October 2015. His goal, the first of the match, came in the 27th minute.

Kukësi 
Rroca signed for fellow Kategoria Superiore club Kukësi on 19 December 2018 for a fee of €50,000, signing a two-year contract until the end of 2020.

İstanbulspor 
Rroca joined Turkish club İstanbulspor in the TFF First League on 18 September 2020 for a fee of €50,000. The Turkish club had originally sent their representative to scout his Kukësi teammate Valon Ethemi, but were impressed by Rroca and made an offer to sign the player soon after. He chose to wear the number 61 shirt and he made his debut for the club in a 3–1 away win against Ümraniyespor on 26 September 2020, starting the game on the left-hand side of midfield. He scored his first official goals for the club in a 3–0 away win over Samsunspor on 17 October 2020, scoring in the 53rd and 57th minute, before assisting Kamal Issah in the 91st minute for the final goal.

Honours 
Luftëtari
Kategoria e Parë: 2015–16

References

External links 
Eduard Rroca at FK Kukësi

1993 births
Living people
People from Librazhd
People from Elbasan County
Albanian footballers
Association football midfielders
Association football forwards
Kategoria Superiore players
Kategoria e Parë players
Kategoria e Dytë players
TFF First League players
Süper Lig players
KS Egnatia Rrogozhinë players
KF Tërbuni Pukë players
Luftëtari Gjirokastër players
FK Kukësi players
İstanbulspor footballers